Broadway Hotel is a heritage-listed hotel at 93 Logan Road, Woolloongabba, City of Brisbane, Queensland, Australia. It was added to the Queensland Heritage Register on 21 October 1992. The building has been in a state of significant disrepair and neglect for several years, covered in graffiti and broken panelling, and in September 2018 was destroyed by a fire.

History 
The Broadway Hotel was built in 1889–90 for Brisbane publican Michael McKenna, formerly of the nearby Woolloongabba Hotel. Tenders were called in July and August 1889, and McKenna was advertising for custom by mid-October 1890.

John Hall & Son were an established Brisbane architectural practice, whose late 1880s Brisbane hotels included the Oriental Hotel, corner of Albert and Mary Streets (1885–86), the Pineapple Hotel, Main Street, Kangaroo Point (1886–87), the Brisbane Bridge Hotel, Stanley Street, South Brisbane (1886–87), the Treasury Hotel, corner of George and Elizabeth Streets (1887–88), the Junction Hotel, corner of Logan and Cleveland Roads, Stones Corner (1887–88), Graham's Hotel, Stanley Street, South Brisbane (1887–88), the Edinburgh Castle Hotel, Gympie Road, Kedron (1888), the Broadway Hotel, corner of Logan Road and Balaclava (Short) Street, Woolloongabba (1889–90) and Burke's Hotel at the intersection of Annerley and Stephens Roads, South Brisbane (1889–90). In 1890 they were also the successful competition winners for the South Brisbane Municipal Chambers. Architect John Smith Murdoch, Chief Architect of the Commonwealth 1926–30, worked in John Hall & Son's office from the late 1880s to 1893, and according to architect JVD Coutts, was responsible for the design of the South Brisbane Municipal Chambers and the Broadway and Burke's hotels.

The site at the corner of Logan Road and Balaclava (Short) Street had been transferred to McKenna in January 1889. The location was a prominent one, close to the intersection of Wellington and Logan roads, the latter being a major Brisbane arterial road. In the second half of the 1880s, the East Brisbane-Woolloongabba-Buranda-Stones Corner-Coorparoo areas experienced a population and housing boom, largely associated with the expansion of Brisbane's railway and tramway systems. The first section of the tramway along Logan Road extended to Maynard Street, Buranda and opened in 1887. The new Broadway Hotel, located prominently to take advantage of the increased traffic flow between Brisbane and the eastern suburbs, was an imposing structure designed to attract attention, and rapidly became a well-known local landmark.

The substantial three-storeyed hotel was designed to cater for country visitors as well. When opened in 1890, the attendant advertising in The Southern World of 22 October emphasised the proximity of the new hotel to the Woolloongabba Fiveways, and that country visitors would be well catered for with superior accommodation. This included single and double bedrooms, bathrooms, and drawing rooms, with luxurious and comfortable appointments throughout. The hotel offered Extensive and Superior Stabling and trams and buses passed the hotel every five minutes.

McKenna remained the proprietor and licensee until 1903, when he leased the hotel to a succession of licensees. In 1917 he sold the property to the Castlemaine Brewery of Quinlan Gray & Co. From 1949 until the early 1980s the licensees were Ron and Ivy Hogarth. In the mid-1980s the hotel was bought by Quetel Pty Ltd and in 1987 was leased to Pub Revive Pty Ltd who undertook a program of refurbishment.

In 1998, Malcolm Nyst, a Brisbane doctor and brother of lawyer and author Chris Nyst bought the hotel for $700,000. Carl Ditterich, a former football player, and his family took over the management of the hotel in early 2010. They established a farmers' market in the car park. In July 2010, a fire extensively damaged the hotel which was under-insured. Basic repairs were undertaken but the hotel has remained closed since. In May 2014 the property was for sale. In early 2018, a property developer scrapped plans to develop a 27-storey residential tower after community objections.

On 2 September 2018, a fire destroyed most of the building. Police are investigating the cause of the blaze.

Description 
The Broadway Hotel is a substantial three storeyed brick building, occupying a prominent corner site with principal facades on Logan Road and Balaclava Street, Woolloongabba.

The building is an elaborate example of late Victorian architecture in Brisbane, influenced by the eclecticism of the "Queen Anne" movement, popularised by English architect, Richard Norman Shaw in the 1880s. It was designed in the tradition of substantial English corner pubs, gaining patronage by attracting the attention of passing trade, using elaborate architectural forms and detailing as advertisement for the business.

When constructed, the Broadway Hotel was of face brick with terracotta and polychrome brick detailing, much like the work of Norman Shaw, particularly his New Scotland Yard (1887–90), and the Tottenham and Rising Sun pubs in London.

The building is asymmetrically arranged, with a principal corner entrance, emphasised by an octagonal tower surmounted by a spire projecting above the roof line of the building. The tower is expressed on the ground floor by an arched entrance portico. The first floor is pierced with square headed arched door openings with terracotta keystones integrated into a continuous decorative moulding; and on the second floor by round headed arched openings bounding an open octagonal seating area.

The rolled zinc mansard roof is partially concealed by a series of Dutch gables, correlating to the bays of windows on the body of the building. Two brick chimney stacks with terracotta corbelling project from the roof.

The north facade, which addresses Logan Road, features a principal central bay formed by a pedimented gable above a wide arched opening with Italianate balustrade, forming a small porch on the second floor and three round headed arched windows on the first floor. This is flanked by two subsidiary bays with gables surmounted by smaller segmental pediments on moulded pilasters at the second floor level and classically derived aedicule window openings below. The ground floor of these subsidiary bays features a tripartite window arrangement of a large central opening flanked by narrower openings with rounded corners.

The Balaclava Street facade, features two vertical bays, defined by similar pedimented gables to those found on the Logan Road facade. Two doorways are found at street level, accessing what were originally the various bars of the hotel. Extending southward from the main body of the building is a one storeyed rendered brick extension.

The Broadway Hotel has a ground floor wherein the bars and public rooms would have been situated, and two floors above where accommodation, sitting rooms and bathroom facilities were provided. The walls and ceilings throughout the interior are plastered and the floors are generally timber.

The public bar area, now one large room on the principal corner of the building, features a timber bar in the corner opposite the entrance. The walls are lined with timber panelling to two metres, braced and edged with timber mouldings. High quality timber joinery surrounds the windows and doors in the bar. The remaining ground floor areas are substantially altered from original form.

The building has a dog leg stair, rising from a ground floor hall off the Logan Road entrance, in which a plaster archway supported on reeded piers separates the stairwell from the entrance. The stair features turned and moulded newels, surmounted by globular finials, and turned balusters.

The upper floors retain their early layout, with rooms accessed from wide corridors, of timber floors and plaster ceilings, featuring elaborate cornices, ceiling roses and plaster archways. The rooms are generally larger, with better fittings on the second floor, and more rudimentary accommodation provided on the first. A large second floor room on the principal corner of the building, accessing the small balcony in the tower, features an ebonised and marbleized timber fireplace, with iron register grate intact. Bathrooms throughout the interior have been modernised.

Interior joinery throughout the first and second floor remains intact and of high quality, although now heavily painted. Most internal doors are four panelled, with operable transom windows above, occasionally arched. Half glazed French doors open onto the verandahs from internal rooms.

Attached by a walkway to the south elevation of the building is an open elevated pavilion, bound on three sides by round headed arched arcades of three bays each. The rear north wall of the pavilion has two large rectangular openings. This structure is of substantial rendered brick construction, with stringcourses and detailing around the arches, and a corrugated iron hipped roof.

In the south corner of the site is a small one storeyed reinforced concrete building, with two entrances of simple timber doors with openings above. The concrete is impressed with the pattern of timber formwork, and has curved corners near the doorways. The building has parapeted facades and a flat skillion roof. It is thought that this may be an air raid shelter.

An alfresco dining area has been created by enclosing the Logan Road footpath with lattice panelling. A drive in bottle shop has been inserted in the west elevation of the building.

Heritage listing 
Broadway Hotel was listed on the Queensland Heritage Register on 21 October 1992 having satisfied the following criteria.

The place is important in demonstrating the evolution or pattern of Queensland's history.

The Broadway Hotel is important in demonstrating the evolution and pattern of Queensland's history, providing evidence of:
1. the pattern of 1880s boom era confidence which lead to a massive building boom throughout Queensland, and most pronouncedly in Brisbane;
2. the evolution of the Woolloongabba-East Brisbane area in response to the growth of the tramway system;

The place is important in demonstrating the principal characteristics of a particular class of cultural places.

The Broadway Hotel is important in illustrating the principal characteristics of a large, masonry, 1880s hotel in Brisbane, designed both as a local landmark to attract regular local custom, and as superior accommodation to attract country/family visitors. It remains substantially intact, and is a good illustration of its type in both design and function.

The place is important because of its aesthetic significance.

The Broadway Hotel is a well composed building which makes a strong contribution to the Woolloongabba townscape and to the streetscape along that part of Logan Road. It occupies a prominent position on Logan Road and is a local landmark.

The place has a special association with the life or work of a particular person, group or organisation of importance in Queensland's history.

The Broadway Hotel has a special association with the work of prominent Brisbane architects John Hall & Son, and in particular with architect John Smith Murdoch of that firm, to whom the design is attributed.

References

Attribution

External links 

Queensland Heritage Register
Woolloongabba
Hotels in Queensland
Articles incorporating text from the Queensland Heritage Register
Hotel buildings completed in 1890
1890 establishments in Australia